Norway competed at the 1968 Summer Olympics in Mexico City. 46 competitors, 38 men and 8 women, took part in 36 events in 11 sports.

Medalists

Gold
 Egil Søby, Steinar Amundsen, Tore Berger, and Jan Johansen — Canoeing, Men's K4 1,000m Kayak Fours

Silver
 Peder Lunde, jr. and Per Olav Wiken — Sailing, Men's Star Team Competition

Athletics

Men's 1500 metres
Arne Kvalheim
 Heat — 3:47.50 min (→ advanced to the semi final)
 Semi final — 3:55.32 min (→ did not advance)
 
Men's 3000 metres steeplechase
Arne Risa
 Heat — 9:07.31 min (→ advanced to the final)
 Final — 9:09.98 min (→ 8th place)

Men's 110 metres hurdles
Kjellfred Weum
 Heat — 14.08 s (→ advanced to the semi final)
 Semi final — 14.04 s (→ did not advance)

Women's high jump
Anne Lise Wærness
 Qualification — 1.60 m (→ did not advance)
 
Women's long jump
Berit Berthelsen
 Qualification — 6.48 m (→ advanced to the final)
 Final — 6.40 m (→ 7th place)

Women's pentathlon
Berit Berthelsen — 4649 pts (→ 18th place)

Boxing

Canoeing

Cycling

Six cyclists represented Norway in 1968.

Individual road race
 Thorleif Andresen
 Tore Milsett
 Jan Erik Gustavsen
 Ørnulf Andresen

Team time trial
 Thorleif Andresen
 Ørnulf Andresen
 Tore Milsett
 Leif Yli

Individual pursuit
 Knut Knudsen

Fencing

Men's épée
 Jan von Koss
 Dag Midling

Gymnastics

Sailing

Shooting

Four shooters, all men, represented Norway in 1968.

50 m pistol
 John Rødseth

300 m rifle, three positions
 Elling Øvergård
 Bjørn Bakken

50 m rifle, three positions
 Bjørn Bakken
 Elling Øvergård

50 m rifle, prone
 Bjørn Bakken
 Elling Øvergård

Trap
 Kjell Sørensen

Swimming

Weightlifting

Wrestling

References

Nations at the 1968 Summer Olympics
1968
1968 in Norwegian sport